Nikki Snelson (born Nicole Snelson) is an American actress, who works mainly in stage musicals.

Biography
Snelson is originally from St. Louis, Missouri and received her training at the Boston Conservatory. Snelson's first major role on Broadway came as "Winnie Tate" in the 1999 Broadway revival of Annie Get Your Gun (musical), opposite Bernadette Peters. She also appeared on Broadway in the revival of Sweet Charity in 2005, starring Christina Applegate.

She was in a long term relationship with actir Christian Campbell, from 2005 to 2007.

In 2007, Snelson originated the role of exercise queen "Brooke Wyndam" in the world premiere of the musical Legally Blonde: The Musical in San Francisco. She performed the same role in the Broadway production at the Palace Theatre, opening in April 2007. She can be heard on the cast recording of the show, and was also in the MTV Broadcast, as well as the reality casting show Legally Blonde: The Musical – The Search for Elle Woods.

In 2008, she left the company of Legally Blonde to join the National tour of A Chorus Line, as "Cassie", starting in May 2008.  She was requested to audition for the role of Cassie, after she had tried out the role of Val for the Broadway revival before. She then appeared in 42nd Street at The Muny in St. Louis in June 2009, as "Annie", opposite Robert Cuccioli.

Snelson originated the role of the Mad Hatter in the world premiere of the new Frank Wildhorn musical Wonderland: Alice's New Musical Adventure.  The musical had its world premiere on November 24, 2009 in previews and officially December 5, 2009 at The David A. Straz Jr. Center for the Performing Arts, Tampa, Florida, and opened at the Alley Theatre, Houston on January 15, 2010. While the plot of the show was reviewed poorly (though the production good), Snelson received great reviews for her portrayal, which featured her performing difficult choreography (by Marguerite Derricks) while singing "high energy" Wildhorn tunes. Tampa Bay Online says Snelson "gives a knock-out performance."  Variety added that Snelson played the Hatter "deliciously wicked." However, before its Broadway production, the musical's creators altered the role of the Hatter drastically, including taking out the dancing, cutting out the sarcastic dialogues, as well as replacing her signature song "Nick of Time," and decided to replace Snelson.  In an interview following this, Snelson said "it was a wonderful experience for me, and I will forever be heartbroken."

She took part in a reading of a new musical Sphinx Winx on March 15, 2010 in New York. The musical has music and lyrics by Kenneth Hitchner, Jr. and a book by Phillip Capice, Bob Keuch and Anne Hitchner.
  
Television and Film
Snelson has appeared in several television shows, including as a guest on Desperate Housewives (2005) and as "Chelsea" on ABC's All My Children (2004).

Snelson played herself in the movie Every Little Step and auditioned for the part of Val, but did not get the part.

She was offered a role in the CW's Valentine, but her contract with the Chorus Line national tour forbid her from leaving, as the producers threatened to sue.

References

External links
Official Website

 Internet Off-Broadway database listing

American musical theatre actresses
Place of birth missing (living people)
Living people
Actresses from St. Louis
Year of birth missing (living people)
21st-century American women